Wyandotte is an unincorporated community in Crawford County, Indiana, in the United States.

History
A post office was established at Wyandotte in 1884, and remained in operation until it was discontinued in 1971. It took its name from the Wyandotte Caves.

References

Unincorporated communities in Crawford County, Indiana
Unincorporated communities in Indiana